Jérémy Chardy was the defending champion but decided not to participate.
Adrian Mannarino defeated Andrej Martin 6–4, 6–3 in the final to win the title.

Seeds

Draw

Finals

Top half

Bottom half

References
 Main Draw
 Qualifying Draw

Internationaux de Nouvelle-Caledonie - Singles
2013 Singles